Furnace is the first album released by the industrial music group Download. Released on Cleopatra Records in 1995, it is dedicated to Dwayne Goettel, who co-wrote the album but died before its release. The album's cover has the distinction of being among the first to make use of Lenticular printing.
After being out of print for years, Cevin Key bought the rights to Furnace from Cleopatra Records and, in 2007, re-released the album through his own label, Subconscious Communications, as part of the "From The Vault II" subscription series under the title Furnace Re:Dux in a limited edition of 1000. This re-issue was advertised as remastered but was in fact the same master as the original release. It did however feature a bonus disc of 8 jam sessions which were the basis of the tracks that would eventually make their way onto Furnace. The re-issue is also out of print.

Track listing

Re:Dux

Personnel
Dwayne Goettel
Philth
Mark Spybey
cEvin Key
Genesis P. Orridge (Guest vocals on tracks 3, 9 and 12)

References

1995 debut albums
Download (band) albums
Cleopatra Records albums